The Warehouse is an alternative nightclub and music venue in Preston, Lancashire, England. It opened in 1972 and has also been known as Raiders.

History
It was originally named The Warehouse, then Raiders, and then back to The Warehouse in 1988 when the current owners took over. Joy Division recorded their live album Preston Warehouse there 12 weeks before Ian Curtis' death.

Popularity of the club led to expansion; with the middle floor opening in 1990 and a third floor in 1993 bringing the capacity to its current approximate of around 650.

Music
Today The Warehouse now serves as an alternative Nightclub compromising of three different ‘Levels’ one on each storey. On the ground floor the DJs only play less mainstream music genres, such as Heavy metal, pop punk, hard rock and emo. On the first floor the music played is more mainstream than the level below including popular genres such as indie rock, britpop and alternative rock. It is these first two floors that attracts a variety of youth subcultures including Preston locals and students from the University of Central Lancashire.
On the top floor, specifically chart music is played including mainstream pop acts such as Lady Gaga. It is this floor that is most similar to a conventional nightclub and therefore does not attract any particular social group, but appeals to a wide audience of people who regularly go nightclubbing.

References

Buildings and structures in Preston
Music venues in Lancashire
Nightclubs in England
Rock music venues